Mount Heber is a mountain on Vancouver Island, British Columbia, Canada, located  northeast of Gold River and  west of Big Den Mountain.

See also
List of mountains of Canada

References

Vancouver Island Ranges
One-thousanders of British Columbia